Telangana cuisine is the cuisine native to the Indian state of Telangana. The Telangana state lies on the Deccan plateau and its topography dictates more millets and roti based dishes. Jowar and Bajra features more prominently in their cuisine.

Staple food
Telangana  in its cuisine, there is special place for rotis made from millet, such as jonna rotte (sorghum), sajja rotte (penisetum), or Sarva Pindi" and Uppudi Pindi (broken rice). In Telangana a gravy or curry is called Koora and Pulusu in based on Tamarind. A deep fry reduction of the same is called Vepudu. Kodi pulusu and vepudu are popular dishes in meat. Vankaya (Brinjal), Aloogadda (potato) koora & fry are some of the many varieties of vegetable dishes. Telangana palakoora is a spinach dish cooked with lentils  eaten with steamed rice and rotis. Peanuts are added as special attraction and in Karimnagar District, cashew nuts are added.

Popular Telangana curry dishes (known as Koora) include Boti (derived from mutton) and Phunti Koora made out of Red Sorrel leaves. Potlakaya pulusu, or Snake gourd stew is one of the daily staple dish.Many Telangana dishes are altered as per their own taste but the root ingredients are similar. Sakinalu is the most popular snack made of rice flour during festivals like Dusshera and Sankranthi making it very delicious and one of its kind  fritters of South India.

Recent years has seen a resurgence of Telangana cuisines in restaurants around Hyderabad with the availability of Telangana thali dish for lunch.

Vegetarian food

In Telangana regions Tamarind, red chilies (koraivikaram) and Asafoetida are predominantly used in Telangana cooking. Roselle is a major staple used extensively in curries and pickles.

Sarva appa, a spicy pancake, is a staple breakfast, made with rice flour, chana dal, ginger, garlic, sesame seeds, curry leaves and green chiles.

References

 
South Indian cuisine
Indian cuisine by state or union territory